Wremen is a railway station on the Nordseebahn line from Cuxhaven to Bremerhaven in Northwestern Germany. It is situated close to the village of Wremen.

History
The station was opened in 1896 as part of the extension from the Bremen to Bremerhaven line toward Cuxhaven. It has been a minor station during its whole existence, as the single-track line toward Cuxhaven allowed for crossings at Dorum railway station only.

South of it, in the village of Imsum, used to be another, similarly minor station. However it was closed and removed in the late 1970s. The Bremerhaven-Speckenbüttel railway station, south of Imsum, was closed in 1988, so Wremen is a notable distance north of the next station currently in operation.

Ever since the advent of the motorcar, the station mainly serves commuters into Bremerhaven and tourists. At some point even international InterRegio trains to Luxembourg and Saarbrücken called at the station, though this service was removed in the late 1990s.

Train services
The following services currently call at the station:

Local services  Cuxhaven - Dorum - Bremerhaven - Bremervörde - Buxtehude

Operational usage
The station today is a very minor station, as all buildings have been scrapped in the 1960s and 1970s, it has since been reduced to the status of a stop.
It underwent some renovation in the early 2000s (decade) to bring its sub-standard platform up to par; when InterRegio trains to Luxembourg were still calling at the station (mainly for tourist reasons), the passengers had to deal with a height difference of 85 centimetres between car floor and platform. Today, EVB services call at the station in varying intervals, usually hourly during weekdays.

References

Buildings and structures in Cuxhaven (district)
Railway stations in Lower Saxony
Railway stations in Germany opened in 1896